K260AM ("Hits 99.9") is a contemporary hit radio station serving the Des Moines, Iowa area of the United States. It broadcasts at 99.9 on the FM dial and on HD Radio subchannel KIOA 93.3-HD2.  The station's studios are located in Des Moines along with the Des Moines Media Group subsidiary of Saga Communications' other Des Moines stations (KSTZ, KIOA, KAZR, KOEZ, KRNT and KPSZ). The station is also a reporter in Nielsen Broadcast Data Systems' overall Top 40 panel due to being a contributor on the BDS Rhythmic Top 40 panel.

Station history
The station signed on as a translator for KSTZ in September 2011, but after it was announced that KZHZ "Hits 105.9" and its rhythmic format was sold to Iowa Public Radio a month earlier in August, Saga Communications quietly acquired the format and intellectual property from Connoisseur Media (KZHZ's parent company) and announced on October 25, 2011, that it would relaunch the format on both KIOA 93.3-HD2 and on translator 99.9, on the closing of KZHZ's sale to IPR. Hits 99.9 officially signed on on Thursday, October 27, 2011, after stunting with kissing sound effects, poking fun at its competitor KKDM "Kiss 107.5" which remains the second top station in the market and is the clear channel station which still is a member of Arbitron. Since 2011, the station has shifted its Rhythmic format to a more mainstream Top 40/CHR direction. As of 2021, in addition to competing against KKDM, it also competes with Cumulus Media’s KWQW.

References

External links
Hits 99.9 official website

See also
List of FM broadcast translators used as primary stations

Contemporary hit radio stations in the United States
260AM
Mass media in Des Moines, Iowa
Radio stations established in 2011